Virginia lost one seat in reapportionment following the 1820 United States Census. Nineteen incumbents ran for re-election, leaving three open seats. Virginia elected its members in April 1823 after the term began, but before the new Congress convened.

See also 
 1822 Virginia's 9th congressional district special election
 1822 and 1823 United States House of Representatives elections
 List of United States representatives from Virginia

Notes 

1823
Virginia
United States House of Representatives